This is a list of the heritage sites in Wynberg Magisterial District in Cape Town, as recognized by the South African Heritage Resources Agency.

	

|}

References 

Wynberg
Tourist attractions in the Western Cape
Heritage
Wynberg, Cape Town